John H. Harland Company is a major USA-based check-printing company; they were described in 2000 by The New York Times as "the second-largest printer of checks in the United States."

Their earnings are followed by The New York Times.

History
The company's initial public offering was in 1969. By 1984 this financial services company had an estimated 20% of the USA check-printing market; only Deluxe Corporation was larger.

Harland purchased a software automation company that services both banks and small businesses mid-2000. Two years later they acquired another software company.

References

Financial services companies of the United States